The Man from the West is a 1914 American short silent Western film directed by Romaine Fielding. It also starred Mary Ryan and Robyn Adair. It was filmed in Silver City, New Mexico, produced by the Lubin Manufacturing Company and distributed by the General Film Company.

Cast
 Romaine Fielding – The Man from the West
 Mary Ryan – Rose Stillwell
 Robyn Adair – Percy, Rose's Fiancé
 Richard Wangermann – Mr. Stillwell (as Richard Wangmann)
 Jesse Robinson – Joe, The Renegade
 Henry Aldrich
 Maurice Cytron

References

External links
 

1914 films
1914 Western (genre) films
1914 short films
American silent short films
American black-and-white films
Films directed by Romaine Fielding
Lubin Manufacturing Company films
Silent American Western (genre) films
1910s American films